Ivan Kley (born 29 June 1958) is a former professional tennis player from Brazil.

During his career, he won one doubles title. He achieved a career-high doubles ranking of world number 56 in 1985.

Grand Prix career finals

Doubles: 2 (1–1)

See also
List of Brazil Davis Cup team representatives

External links
 
 

Brazilian male tennis players
People from Novo Hamburgo
Living people
1958 births
Brazilian people of German descent
Tennis players at the 1979 Pan American Games
Pan American Games competitors for Brazil
Sportspeople from Rio Grande do Sul
20th-century Brazilian people
21st-century Brazilian people